The 2021–22 Czech First League, known as the FORTUNA:LIGA is the 29th season of the Czech Republic's top-tier football for professional clubs since its establishment, in 1993. SK Slavia Prague are the reigning champions. The season has started on 24 July 2021. The first half of the season will have 19 rounds, finishing on 19 December 2021, and the other half will commence on 5 February 2022. The season is expected to end on 14 May 2022 with two extra play-out fixtures on 19 and 22 May 2022.

The season format was changed back to be played with 16 clubs, each team will play in the league format home and away matches. The lowest-ranked team will be relegated directly to the second league, the two teams positioned 14th and 15th will play a play-out with two teams from the second league positioned 2nd and 3rd in a home and away format. This will be the fourth season to use VAR, featuring it in all matches played. All matches will be played on weekdays, no Friday fixtures are expected.

Season summary
This season is the fourth season sponsored by the betting agency Fortuna with a contract valid until 2024. It is also the fourth season with TV broadcasting rights held by O2 TV, which shows all eight matches per week. This is the first season, that the national broadcaster ČT Sport possesses no right to broadcast any of the fixtures. The newspaper iSport.cz holds rights for the highlights from all matches.
The 2021–22 season began on Saturday 24 July, just thirteen days after the final match of the 2020 UEFA European Football Championship. With most of the national team players still released for vacations, Slavia, Sparta and Viktoria started with incomplete A-team squads. 

Many predicted Slavia's domination for the fourth season running, Viktoria and Sparta were considered as the candidates for a race for the title. After ten match-weeks the trio recorded one loss each, Viktoria in 6th round at Hradec Králové, Sparta in 7th round in Plzeň and Slavia in round 10 in the Prague S-derby at  Letná on 3 October 2021. Sparta ended the longest non-winning streak of derby matches after five and half years at 14 matches. It was also an interruption of Slavia's record unbeaten streak of 54 matches in the first league. Three weeks later Slavia defeated Plzeň and in the 15th match-week Slovácko sensationally defeated Sparta 4–0, which escalated them to 2nd place behind Slavia. Unfortunately, Slovácko did not confirm the point tally in the following matches and positioned fourth at the winter break behind the big trio.

Teams

Promotion and relegation (pre-season)
A total of sixteen teams contest the league, including fifteen sides from the 2020–21 season and the winner of last season's second league.

Team promoted to Czech First League

Due to a reduction from 18 to 16 teams, only the winner of the FNL advanced to the first league. On 8 May 2021 Hradec Králové defeated Dukla Prague 2–1 and secured the promotion with three matches remaining. Hradec Králové will participate in the top tier after four years of absence.

Teams relegated from Czech First League

The three lowest positioned teams from the last season were relegated to the Fortuna National League. 

On 8 May 2021, Opava became the first team to be relegated to FNL after a 1–1 draw at Zlín with three games remaining, ending their three-year stay in the top flight.

On 16 May 2021, Zbrojovka became the second team to be relegated to FNL after a 1–1 draw at Slovan Liberec with two games remaining, ending their one-year stay in the top flight. 

On 23 May 2021, Příbram's relegation was confirmed following a 0–1 defeat at home against Pardubice with one game remaining, ending their First League tenure after three years.

Locations and stadiums

Personnel and kits

Managerial changes
Ahead of the season:

During the season:

Regular season

League table

Results

Championship group
Points and goals were carried over in full from the regular season.

Play-off
Because only four teams advance to the European Cups from the Czech First League due to a low national coefficient, the winner of the play-off will only receive a cash bonus and a better position in the 2022–23 Czech Cup.

Relegation group
Points and goals were carried over in full from the regular season.

Relegation play-offs
Teams placed 14th and 15th in the relegation group faced the teams placed 2nd and 3rd in the Czech National Football League for two spots in the next season.

Season statistics

Top scorers
Updated at the end of the season.

Hat-tricks

Notes
4 Player scored 4 goals(H) – Home team(A) – Away team

Clean sheets
Updated at the end of the season.

Awards

Monthly awards

Annual awards
Source:

References

2021–22 in European association football leagues
1
2021-22